Graham Mertz (born December 6, 2000) is an American football quarterback for the Florida Gators. He previously played for the Wisconsin Badgers before transferring to Florida in 2023.

Early life and high school career
Mertz's first two years of high school were spent at Bishop Miege High School in Roeland Park, Kansas. While there, he played high school football and backed up all-state quarterback Carter Putz. Before his junior year, Mertz transferred to Blue Valley North High School in Overland Park, Kansas. He led Blue Valley North to a Class 6A state championship as a junior, and to state runner-up as a senior. In his senior year he completed 61.1% of his passes for 3,886 yards and a state-record 51 touchdowns. He was a finalist for the Elite 11 quarterback competition in 2018, and was named Gatorade Kansas Football Player of the Year. Graham was invited to the All-American Bowl after his senior season, where he set a bowl record with five touchdown passes and was named game MVP.

Mertz was rated as a four-star recruit by ESPN, 247Sports.com, and Rivals.com. ESPN rated him as the best pocket passer in the class of 2019 and 21st highest rated recruit overall. In the 247Sports Composite, Mertz was rated as the third-highest rated pro-style quarterback, the highest rated Kansas recruit, and 65th highest rated recruit overall.

Mertz committed to play football at the University of Wisconsin–Madison on October 9, 2017.

College career
Three-year Wisconsin starting quarterback Alex Hornibrook announced that he would be transferring to Florida State for the 2019 season, leaving the starting role open for competition between Mertz and junior Jack Coan. ESPN described Mertz as Wisconsin's "most hyped QB since Russell Wilson." Mertz ultimately lost the starting job to Coan, and redshirted his true freshman season after appearing in two games.

With Coan injured in practice before the 2020 season, Mertz began the season as the starting quarterback, becoming the first freshman quarterback to start a season-opening game for the Badgers since 1978. Mertz started the game with 17 consecutive completed passes, tying the school record, and his final line of 20-for-21 broke the school single-game completion percentage record with 95.2%. His five passing touchdowns in the 45–7 win over Illinois also tied the school single-game record. He was named Big Ten Co-Offensive Player of the Week and Freshman of the Week for the performance. The day after the Illinois game, Mertz tested positive for COVID-19, in what would prove to be a team-wide outbreak that forced the cancellation of their next two games against Nebraska and Purdue. Mertz recovered in time for the team's next game against Michigan, which the Badgers won 49–11, despite a more subdued performance from Mertz, who threw for 127 yards and two touchdowns in the game. Wisconsin lost its next three games, against Northwestern, Indiana, and Iowa, with Mertz throwing four interceptions to just one passing touchdown during that stretch. In the final game of the regular season, against rival Minnesota, played on Big Ten Championship Saturday, Mertz left the game in the third quarter with an ankle injury. The Badgers eventually won in overtime, 20–17. The Badgers were invited to play against Wake Forest in the Duke's Mayo Bowl. Mertz went 11-for-17, with 130 passing yards and one touchdown in the 42–28 win. After the game, Mertz dropped the trophy in the locker room celebration, shattering the football made of glass on the top of the trophy.

Mertz served as the starting quarterback in all 13 games for Wisconsin during his redshirt sophomore season in 2021, leading the Badgers to a 9–4 record and a victory in the Las Vegas Bowl. He finished the season with 1,958 passing yards, 10 passing touchdowns, and 11 interceptions.

Mertz served as the starting quarterback for Wisconsin once again in his redshirt junior season in 2022, leading the Badgers to a 6–6 regular season record. In a 42–7 win against Northwestern on October 8th, he set a career high with 299 passing yards and five touchdown passes. He finished the season with 2,136 passing yards, 19 passing touchdowns, and 10 interceptions.

On December 4, 2022, prior to Wisconsin's bowl game, Mertz announced he was entering the transfer portal.

Florida

Statistics
As of November 26, 2022:

College accolades

Awards and honors
Big Ten Conference
 1x Big Ten Co-Offensive Player of the Week (2020)
 1× Big Ten Freshman of the Week (2020)

Personal life
Graham's father, Ron Mertz, played football as an offensive lineman at Minnesota from 1989–92. Graham has two sisters that played college basketball: Lauren, at Kansas State, and Mya, at Drake.

References

External links
 Wisconsin Badgers bio

Living people
Players of American football from Kansas
American football quarterbacks
Sportspeople from Overland Park, Kansas
Wisconsin Badgers football players
2000 births
Florida Gators football players